Claude Jones (February 11, 1901 – January 17, 1962) was an American jazz trombonist.

Biography
Born in Boley, Oklahoma, United States, Jones began playing trombone at the age of 13, and studied at Wilberforce College before dropping out in 1922 to join the Synco Jazz Band. This group eventually evolved into McKinney's Cotton Pickers, where he would play intermittently until 1929.

From there, Jones played in a variety of noted swing jazz ensembles, including those of  Fletcher Henderson (1929–31, 1933–34, 1941–42, 1950), Don Redman (1931–33, 1943), Alex Hill, Chick Webb, and Cab Calloway (1934–40, 1943). He recorded with Jelly Roll Morton in 1939 and Louis Armstrong/Sidney Bechet in 1940. In the 1940s, he also played with Coleman Hawkins, Zutty Singleton, Joe Sullivan, Benny Carter, and Duke Ellington (1944–48, 1951).

After completing his second stint with Ellington, Jones became a mess steward on the ship SS United States, and he died at sea in 1962.

References
Footnotes

General references

1901 births
1962 deaths
American jazz trombonists
Male trombonists
Musicians from Oklahoma
People who died at sea
People from Boley, Oklahoma
20th-century American musicians
20th-century trombonists
Jazz musicians from Oklahoma
20th-century American male musicians
American male jazz musicians
McKinney's Cotton Pickers members
The Cab Calloway Orchestra members